Abel's binomial theorem, named after Niels Henrik Abel, is a mathematical identity involving sums of binomial coefficients. It states the following:

Example

The case m = 2

See also

 Binomial theorem
 Binomial type

References

 

Factorial and binomial topics
Theorems in algebra